is a company that operates a chain of supermarkets in Japan. Most of the stores are mainly located in the Chūbu and Kantō regions, with an international branch in Cityplaza, Taikoo Shing, Hong Kong operated by Uny (HK) Co., Ltd. with a brand name called APiTA, which is a subsidiary company of Henderson Land Development, a Hong Kong real estate company controlled by Hong Kong tycoon Lee Shau-kee. The company is headquartered in Inazawa, Aichi Prefecture.

In June 2018, UNY Hong Kong was acquired by Henderson Investment Ltd. and officially renamed as “Unicorn Stores (HK) Ltd.”, rather acquired by its subsidiary company Urban Kirin. Therefore, Uny became an indirect wholly owned subsidiary of the company.

Chains
 APiTA
 Circle K Sunkus
 Piago

Stores
So far, Unicorn Stores (HK) Ltd. operates 2 GMS and 2 supermarkets, namely APITA in Tai Koo, UNY in Lok Fu, Yuen Long, and Tseung Kwan O, as well as Guu San (the new premium Japanese lifestyle grocery store of Unicorn Stores (HK)) in Tsim Sha Tsui.

References

External links

Uny Co., Ltd. (Japanese)
Uny (HK) Co, Ltd. (English, Chinese & Japanese)

Companies listed on the Tokyo Stock Exchange
Supermarkets of Japan
Department stores of Hong Kong
Supermarkets of Hong Kong
Retail companies established in 1969